This is a list of singles that have peaked in the Top 10 of the Billboard Hot 100 during 1980. The longest running top-ten single of the year was "Another One Bites the Dust" by Queen with 15 weeks. Kenny Rogers, Air Supply, and Michael Jackson each had three top-ten hits in 1980, tying them for the most top-ten hits during the year.

Top-ten singles

1979 peaks

1981 peaks

See also
 1980 in music
 List of Hot 100 number-one singles of 1980 (U.S.)
 Billboard Year-End Hot 100 singles of 1980

References

General sources

Joel Whitburn Presents the Billboard Hot 100 Charts: The Seventies
Joel Whitburn Presents the Billboard Hot 100 Charts: The Eighties
Additional information obtained can be verified within Billboard's online archive services and print editions of the magazine.

1980
United States Hot 100 Top 10